The Shurangama or Śūraṅgama mantra is a dhāraṇī or long mantra of Buddhist practice in East Asia. Although relatively unknown in modern Tibet, there are several Śūraṅgama Mantra texts in the Tibetan Buddhist canon. It has strong associations with the Chinese Chan Buddhist tradition. 

The mantra was, according to the opening chapter of the Śūraṅgama Sūtra, historically transmitted by Gautama Buddha to Manjushri to protect Ananda before he had become an arhat. It was again spoken by the Buddha before an assembly of monastic and lay adherents.

Like the popular six-syllable mantra "om mani padme hum" and the Nīlakaṇṭha Dhāraṇī, the Śūraṅgama mantra is synonymous with practices of Avalokiteśvara, an important bodhisattva in both East Asian Buddhism and Tibetan Buddhism. The Śūraṅgama Mantra also extensively references Buddhist deities such as the bodhisattvas Manjushri, Mahākāla, Sitatapatra, Vajrapani and the Five Tathagatas, especially Bhaisajyaguru. It is often used for protection or purification, as it is often recited as part of the daily morning session in monasteries.

Within the Śūraṅgama Sūtra , the Sanskrit incantation (variously referred to as dhāraṇī or mantra) contained therein, is known as the Sitātapatroṣṇīṣa dhāraṇī, The "Śūraṅgama mantra" is well-known and popularly chanted in East Asian Buddhism, where it is very much related to the practice of the "White Parasol Dhāraṇī". In Tibetan Buddhism, it is the "White Umbrella"..

History
In 168-179 CE, the Gandharan monk Lokakṣema arrives in Han China and translates the Śūraṅgama Sūtra into Classical Chinese.

The currently popular version of the Śūraṅgama Sūtra and Śūraṅgama mantra were translated and transliterated from Sanskrit to Chinese characters during the Tang dynasty by the monk Paramiti from North India and reviewed by Meghashikara from Oddiyana after Empress Regnant Wu Zetian retired in the year 705.

The Śūraṅgama mantra was promoted and popularised by the Chan monk Hsuan Hua in North America and the Sinophone world, who valued it as fundamental to Buddhism's existence.

Commentary 
The dhāraṇī is often seen as having magical apotropaic powers. It is associated with the deity Sitātapatra, a protector against supernatural dangers and evil beings. According to the Chan Buddhist monk Venerable Hsuan Hua, the dhāraṇī contains five major divisions, which "control the vast demon armies of the five directions":

 In the East is the Vajra Division, hosted by Akṣobhya
 In the South, the Jewel-creating Division, hosted by Ratnasaṃbhava
 In the center, the Buddha Division, hosted by Vairocana
 In the West, the Lotus Division, hosted by Amitābha
 In the North, the Karma Division, hosted by Amoghasiddhi

See also
Nīlakaṇṭha Dhāraṇī
Guhyasamāja Tantra
Uṣṇīṣa Vijaya Dhāraṇī Sūtra

Notes

References
The Śūraṅgama Sūtra Translation Committee of the Buddhist Text Translation Society. (2009). The Śūraṅgama Sūtra: With Excerpts from the Commentary by the Venerable Master Hsüan Hua: A New Translation. Ukiah, CA, USA:  Buddhist Text Translation Society.
"A short commentary and Instruction on how to chant the Shurangama Mantra by the Venerable Tripitaka Master Hsuan Hua"

External links
 
(2009). The Śūraṅgama Sūtra: With Excerpts from the Commentary by the Venerable Master Hsüan Hua: A New Translation. Ukiah, CA, USA:  Buddhist Text Translation Society..
 
 Recitation of the Shurangama Mantra, Master Chan Yun (audio)
 The Shurangama Mantra (Mahā-tathāgatoṣṇīṣa-śūraṃgama-mantra) 

Buddhist tantras
Vajrayana
Chinese Buddhist texts
Tibetan Buddhist practices
67
Buddhist mantras
Sanskrit texts
Buddhism in China
Buddhism in Japan
Buddhism in Korea
1st century in religion